Pauline Parmentier (born 31 January 1986) is a French former tennis player.

Her career-high WTA singles ranking is world No. 40, which she attained on 21 July 2008. On 30 April 2012, she peaked at world No. 89 on the WTA doubles rankings. She won four singles titles on the WTA Tour, as well as ten singles and three doubles titles on the ITF Women's Circuit. She competed in the singles and women's doubles events at the 2008 Summer Olympics, and had been playing for France in the Fed Cup since 2010 (win–loss record: 7–14). Parmentier retired following the 2020 French Open.

Personal life
Parmentier was born in the northern French town of Cucq. Parmentier's parents are named Dominique and Jean-Philippe and she has two older brothers named Olivier and Julien. Pauline began playing tennis at age six and trained for five years at the Mouratoglou Tennis Academy.

Career

2000–2003
In 2000, Parmentier played only one tournament on the ITF Women's Circuit; she lost her main-draw opening match in both the singles and doubles events of a $10k tournament held in November in the French commune of Villenave-d'Ornon.

In 2001, she played just three ITF tournaments (in Villenave-d'Ornon, Le Havre and Deauville – all held in November, $10k each) and only took part in their singles events; she was eliminated in the qualifying rounds of all of them.

She did not play a single ITF event in 2002.
She did not have any year-end WTA singles or doubles ranking for 2000, 2001 and 2002.

Parmentier played 13 tournaments in the 2003 ITF Women's Circuit, appearing in their singles or doubles events or both.

2004–2005
In May 2004, she made her WTA Tour singles debut at the Internationaux de Strasbourg, losing in the second qualifying round to Henrieta Nagyová. At her Grand Slam debut at the 2004 French Open (she received wildcards for both events), she lost in the second singles qualifying round to Roberta Vinci and in the first round of the women's doubles.

It was in 2005 at the French Open that Parmentier appeared in the singles main draw of a WTA tournament for the first time in her career; she entered as a wildcard and lost in the first round to Iveta Benešová. At the US Open, she won three qualifying matches to reach the main draw, where she lost to No. 2 seed Lindsay Davenport in the second round.

2007: First WTA singles title
Parmentier again qualified for the main draw of the US Open where she defeated Tatjana Malek in the first round and fell to Martina Hingis in the second. She broke into the top 100 (at world No. 87) of the rankings for the first time in her career on 10 September 2007 (her singles ranking was No. 106 on 27 August, at the start of the 2007 US Open). Parmentier won her first career WTA singles title at the Tashkent Open as an unseeded player in October 2007; she did not drop a set during the tournament, defeating the three top seeds Dominika Cibulková (first round), Olga Govortsova (semifinals) and Victoria Azarenka (final)] en route to winning the title.
She also won three ITF singles titles in 2007.

2008: Second WTA singles title
On 18 February 2008, two days after losing in the semifinals of the Tier-III Cachantún Cup in Viña del Mar to top seed Flavia Pennetta, Parmentier made her debut in the top 50 of the singles rankings; she rose from world No. 53 at the start of the 2008 Cachantún Cup to No. 47. She won the title at Bad Gastein in July – it was her second career WTA (and first Tier III) singles title. Seeded No. 4, she defeated top seed Ágnes Szávay in the semifinals before defeating qualifier Lucie Hradecká in the final. Parmentier was nominated to play at the Summer Olympics after Mary Pierce and Amélie Mauresmo withdrew. She lost her singles first-round match to the No. 16 seed Dominika Cibulková and her doubles first-round match (she was paired with Tatiana Golovin) to the Indian pair of Sania Mirza and Sunitha Rao by walkover.

2010
Parmentier made her Fed Cup debut at the World Group quarterfinal tie against the team of the United States in February 2010. She lost her first match against Melanie Oudin but won her second against Christina McHale by the same scoreline. France lost the tie 1–4.

Parmentier qualified for the singles main draw of the Miami Open by defeating American teenager Lauren Davis and Tamarine Tanasugarn in the qualifying rounds; in the main draw, she beat Sybille Bammer before losing to No. 25 seed Ana Ivanovic in the second round.

2012
In late May, the unseeded Parmentier upset the top seed Sabine Lisicki (who was then ranked world No. 12 in the singles ranking) in the first round of the Internationaux de Strasbourg. She then defeated Stéphanie Foretz in the second round and Alexandra Panova in the quarterfinals to reach her first WTA singles semifinal since winning the title in Bad Gastein; she lost her semifinal to her compatriot and unseeded wildcard Alizé Cornet in three sets.

At the US Open, as an unseeded player, Parmentier defeated No. 25 seed Yanina Wickmayer in the second round before losing to No. 5 seed Petra Kvitová in the third; it was the first time that she had advanced to the third round of the main draw in a Grand Slam tournament.

2013
In 2013, Parmentier won only one match (Auckland, held in the first week of January) and exited the first round nine times in ten WTA singles main-draw events, including the Australian Open, French Open and Wimbledon. She missed several events in April and May because of a right shoulder injury. In the second half of the year, she played the singles events of eleven tournaments (ten of those on ITF level), including the US Open qualifying event.

2014: French Open fourth round
In the first week of January, the unseeded Parmentier lost in the semifinals of the $25k tournament in Hong Kong to Elizaveta Kulichkova in three sets after having defeated top seed Magda Linette in the first round and eighth-seeded Mayo Hibi in the quarterfinals.

At the French Open, Parmentier achieved her career-best singles showing in a Grand Slam tournament. She had received a main-draw wildcard and was ranked world No. 145 in the WTA rankings coming into that tournament. There she defeated three players then ranked in the top 100 (the No. 17 seed Roberta Vinci, the unseeded Yaroslava Shvedova and the unseeded Mona Barthel) before losing to the unseeded Garbiñe Muguruza in the fourth round.

2016
In the first five months of 2016, Parmentier reached at least the last eight of the singles main draw in four WTA tournaments as a lucky loser, unseeded player or wildcard; she lost to No. 8 seed, Dominika Cibulková, in the semifinals in Katowice (that was her first singles semifinal appearance on the WTA Tour since the 2012 Internationaux de Strasbourg) and was defeated in the singles quarterfinals in Monterrey, Rabat and Strasbourg.

She was the No. 88 in the singles rankings coming into the French Open, defeating No. 31 seed Monica Niculescu in the first round and Irina Falconi in the second before losing to No. 8 seed, Timea Bacsinszky, in the third.

In July, the unseeded Parmentier reached her fifth and final WTA singles quarterfinal of the year at the Bucharest tournament, where she lost to Vania King.

2017
In February, Parmentier played only one match (which was the fourth and final singles rubber) in the Fed Cup World Group quarterfinal against Switzerland. She lost it to Belinda Bencic, what enabled Switzerland to take an unassailable 3–1 lead and sent France to the World Group Play-offs. Three weeks after her Fed Cup defeat, the unseeded Parmentier lost in the quarterfinals of the WTA Tour tournament in Acapulco to top seed Mirjana Lučić-Baroni.

Coming into the Premier Mandatory Indian Wells Open, Parmentier had never in her singles career beaten a player ranked in the WTA top ten. In that tournament, Parmentier came close to doing so, holding a set point in the first set and leading 4–1 in the third set of her third-round match against world No. 2, Angelique Kerber, before losing in three sets. She also lost in the third round of the Miami Open (the next Premier Mandatory tournament) to world No. 11, Johanna Konta, after causing an upset by beating No. 24 seed Tímea Babos in the second round.

After her good performances at the Indian Wells and Miami, Parmentier lost in the first round of her next four tournaments (all of them WTA tournaments) – Biel, Rabat, Madrid and Strasbourg. At the Strasbourg tournament, she failed to convert two match points while leading 6–5 in the final set against the American qualifier Madison Brengle. She ended her run of four consecutive singles main-draw first-round defeats at the French Open when she defeated Irina Khromacheva, before losing to Carina Witthöft in the second round.

In July, she reached her second WTA Tour singles quarterfinal of the year at the tournament in Bucharest, where she eliminated No. 5 seed, Elise Mertens, in the second round before losing her quarterfinal match against No. 7 seed, Irina-Camelia Begu. In her third-last event of the year in Luxembourg, Parmentier won three qualifying and three main-draw matches to reach her first and only singles semifinal of the 2017 WTA Tour, where she lost to Carina Witthöft in three sets (it was Witthöft's third straight win over Parmentier). In November, Parmentier narrowly failed to qualify for her first WTA 125 singles final when she was beaten in three sets in the semifinals by Monica Niculescu at the Open de Limoges. However, she reached her first career WTA 125 doubles final at Limoges; she and her partner Chloé Paquet lost in the final to Valeria Savinykh and Maryna Zanevska.

2018: Two more WTA singles titles ten years after her last one
In the first 15 weeks of the year, Parmentier compiled a singles match record of two wins and 13 defeats. During that period, she won her first-round match but lost her second-round match in the singles main draw events at the Taiwan Open and in Croissy-Beaubourg. She registered eleven other singles defeats during that period by losing both her matches in the Fed Cup World Group quarterfinal tie against Belgium on 10–11 February, and her opening matches at seven WTA tournaments (Shenzhen, Hobart, Australian Open, Budapest, Acapulco, Indian Wells and Miami) and two ITF tournaments (Andrézieux-Bouthéon and Tunis). In April, Parmentier played in the World Group semifinal tie against the United States in Aix-en-Provence. She pushed two players ranked in the top 20 to tight losses, losing to Sloane Stephens and Madison Keys; the Americans won the tie 3–2.

At the Istanbul Cup, held in the last week of April, Parmentier registered her first career singles win over a top-ten player in her 16th attempt by defeating the top seed and world No. 2, Caroline Wozniacki, who retired in the quarterfinals, after leading 4–6, 6–3 due to a left abdominal injury. She then defeated the No. 7 seed, Irina-Camelia Begu, in the semifinals to reach her first WTA Tour singles final since winning the 2008 Gastein Ladies title. In the final, she defeated the unseeded Polona Hercog to win her third career singles title. On 30 April, the day after winning the Istanbul Cup singles title, Parmentier rose from No. 122 (seven days earlier) to world No. 76 in the singles rankings.

She lost in the first and second round in her next two tournaments, in Cagnes-sur-Mer and Strasbourg, respectively. She entered the main draw of the French Open as a wildcard, and defeated Chloé Paquet (another French wildcard) and Alizé Cornet (seeded No. 32) in the first and second rounds, respectively, both in three sets. She lost to second seeded Caroline Wozniacki in the third round. Parmentier played only one pre-Wimbledon grass-court tournament in June, in Southsea, where she was defeated by Kirsten Flipkens in the semifinals. Parmentier lost her opening matches in her next two tournaments (Wimbledon and Contrexéville) to Taylor Townsend and Zheng Saisai, respectively. Parmentier entered the Bucharest Open as the No. 7 seed and defeated Alexandra Dulgheru in three sets. In her second-round match against Wang Yafan, Parmentier was trailing 6–7, 0–3 when she was forced to retire because of a neck injury. The following week, she was beaten in the first round in Moscow by third-seeded Anastasija Sevastova. Parmentier entered the main draw of the New Haven tournament as a lucky loser, losing in the first round to Anett Kontaveit. She lost her opening matches in her next two tournaments (US Open and Chicago Challenger) to Madison Keys and Dayana Yastremska, respectively.

Performance timelines

Only main-draw results in WTA Tour, Grand Slam tournaments, Fed Cup and Olympic Games are included in win–loss records.

Singles

Doubles

WTA career finals

Singles: 4 (4 titles)

Doubles: 1 (runner–up)

WTA Challenger finals

Doubles: 1 (runner–up)

ITF Circuit finals

Singles: 25 (10 titles, 15 runner–ups)

Doubles: 5 (3 titles, 2 runner–ups)

Top-10 wins per season

Fed Cup participation

Notes

References

External links

 
 
 

1986 births
Living people
People from Cucq
Tennis players from Paris
French female tennis players
Olympic tennis players of France
Tennis players at the 2008 Summer Olympics
Sportspeople from Pas-de-Calais